Greatest Hits is a compilation album by American rock band Monster Magnet, released in 2003 via A&M Records. The first disc contains the band's best-known material, and contains tracks from 1991's Spine of God (albeit re-recorded) up until their 2000 effort, God Says No, while the second disc contains the band's music videos and a few B-sides and rarities.

Track listing

Disc one
 "Tractor"  – 3:27 (from Monster Magnet, re-recorded on Powertrip)
 "Medicine"  – 3:53 (from Spine of God, re-recorded on God Says No)
 "Dopes to Infinity"  – 5:46 (from Dopes to Infinity)
 "Melt"  – 5:45 (from God Says No)
 "Space Lord"  – 5:56 (from Powertrip)
 "Powertrip"  – 3:32 (from Powertrip)
 "Atomic Clock"  – 5:07 (from Powertrip)
 "Heads Explode"  – 3:49 (from God Says No)
 "Bummer"  – 7:36 (from Powertrip)
 "Negasonic Teenage Warhead"  – 4:28 (from Dopes to Infinity)
 "Dead Christmas"  – 3:55 (from Dopes to Infinity)
 "Silver Future"  – 4:59 (from God Says No (bonus track))
 "Black Balloon"  – 3:06 (from Superjudge)
 "Crop Circle"  – 5:33 (from Powertrip)
 "Kiss of the Scorpion"  – 4:02 (from God Says No)
 "Space Lord (Intergalactic 7 Remix)"  – 5:25 (previously unreleased)

Disc two
 "Unsolid"  – 2:51 (B-side to "Face Down")
 "Big God"  – 5:58 (B-side to "Let It Ride", bonus track on Japanese editions of Powertrip)
 "Into the Void"  – 8:05 (Black Sabbath cover, previously released on the tribute album Nativity in Black II: A Tribute to Black Sabbath)
 "I Want More"  – 3:51 (previously released as a bonus track on the UK version of God Says No)
 "Space Lord" (video) (from Powertrip)
 "Powertrip" (video) (from Powertrip)
 "See You in Hell" (video) (from Powertrip)
 "Heads Explode" (video) (from God Says No)
 "Twin Earth" (video) (from Superjudge)
 "Face Down" (video) (from Superjudge)
 "Negasonic Teenage Warhead" (video) (from Dopes to Infinity)
 "Space Lord (Intergalactic 7 Remix)" (video) (previously unreleased)

Personnel
Dave Wyndorf – vocals, guitar
Ed Mundell – lead guitar
Phil Caivano – guitar on tracks 2, 4, 8, 12, and 15 on first disc; tracks 3 and 4 on second disc
Joe Calandra – bass
Jon Kleiman – drums

References

Monster Magnet albums
A&M Records compilation albums
2003 greatest hits albums